STS-40, the eleventh launch of Space Shuttle Columbia, was a nine-day mission in June 1991. It carried the Spacelab module for Spacelab Life Sciences 1 (SLS-1), the fifth Spacelab mission and the first dedicated solely to biology. STS-40 was the first spaceflight that included three women crew members.

Crew

Backup crew

Crew seating arrangements

Mission highlights 

The launch was originally set for May 22, 1991. The mission was postponed less than 48 hours before launch when it became known that a leaking liquid hydrogen transducer in the orbiter's main propulsion system, which was removed and replaced during leak testing in 1990, had failed an analysis by a vendor. Engineers feared that one or more of the nine liquid hydrogen and liquid oxygen transducers protruding into fuel and oxidizer lines could break off and be ingested by the engine turbopumps, causing engine failure.

In addition, one of the orbiter's five general purpose computers failed completely, along with one of the multiplexer demultiplexers that controlled the orbiter's hydraulics ordinance and Orbital Maneuvering System / Reaction Control System functions in the aft compartment.

A new general purpose computer and multiplexer demultiplexer were installed and tested. One liquid hydrogen and two liquid oxygen transducers were replaced upstream in the propellant flow system near the  disconnect area, which is protected by internal screen. Three liquid oxygen transducers were replaced in the engine manifold area, while three liquid hydrogen transducers here were removed and the openings plugged. The launch was reset for 8:00 a.m. EDT, June 1, 1991, but postponed again after several attempts to calibrate inertial measurement unit 2 failed. The unit was replaced and retested, and the launch was rescheduled for June 5, 1991. The mission launched successfully on June 5, 1991, at 9:24:51 a.m. The launch was also captured on IMAX cameras, and used in the 2015 documentary film Journey to Space.

It was the fifth dedicated Spacelab mission, Spacelab Life Sciences-1, and first dedicated solely to life sciences, using the habitable module. The mission featured the most detailed and interrelated physiological measurements in space since the 1973-1974 Skylab missions. The subjects involved were humans, 30 rodents and thousands of tiny jellyfish. Primary SLS-1 experiments studied six body systems; of 18 investigations, ten involved humans, seven involved rodents, and one used jellyfish.

Six body systems investigated were cardiovascular/cardiopulmonary (heart, lungs and blood vessels); renal/endocrine (kidneys and hormone-secreting organs and glands); blood (blood plasma); immune system (white blood cells); musculoskeletal (muscles and bones); and neurovestibular (brains and nerves, eyes and inner ear). Other payloads included twelve Getaway Special (GAS) canisters installed on GAS bridge in cargo bay for experiments in materials science, plant biology and cosmic radiation (see G-616); Middeck Zero-Gravity Dynamics Experiment (MODE); and seven Orbiter Experiments (OEX).

Columbia landed on June 14, 1991, at 8:39:11 a.m. PDT, on Runway 22, at Edwards Air Force Base, California. It returned to KSC on June 21, 1991.

Wake-up calls 
NASA began a tradition of playing music to astronauts during the Project Gemini, which was first used to wake up a flight crew during Apollo 15. Each track is specially chosen, often by the astronauts' families, and usually has a special meaning to an individual member of the crew, or is applicable to their daily activities.

See also 

 G-616 "The effects of Cosmic Radiation on Floppy Disks"
 List of human spaceflights
 List of Space Shuttle missions
 Outline of space science
 Space Shuttle

References

External links 

 NASA mission summary 
 STS-40 Video Highlights 

Space Shuttle missions
Edwards Air Force Base
Spacecraft launched in 1991
June 1991 events